Curtis Lamont Conway Sr (born January 13, 1971) is a former American football wide receiver in the National Football League (NFL). He was drafted by the Chicago Bears in the first round of the 1993 NFL Draft out of the University of Southern California  (USC). Conway also played for the San Diego Chargers, New York Jets and San Francisco 49ers.

High school years
Conway attended Hawthorne High School in Hawthorne, California and was a football and a track star. He won All-America honors as a senior quarterback. His high school quarterback coach was Dave Keller. His high school track coach was legendary coach Kye Courtney.  Even though he was an All-American quarterback, he was more known for his exploits on the track. During that era, Hawthorne was a regular contender at the CIF California State Meet.  In 1987 as a sophomore he was the anchor of the California State Record 4X100m relay team (40.24) set in the preliminaries, Hawthorne High School was DQ'd at the finals after initially finishing second. In 1988 as a junior he placed second in the 100m (10.85) and placed third 3rd in the 200m (21.30). In 1989 as a senior he won the 100m state title with the time of 10.23 and placed 2nd in the 200m (20.89).

College career
Prior to USC, Conway attended El Camino Junior College in Torrance, California, but did not play. He went to USC as a QB but converted to WR in 1991.

1990: 26 kick returns for 555 yards. 12 punt returns for 161 yards and one touchdown.
1991: 21 catches for 240 yards and one touchdown. 18 carries for 29 yards and one touchdown. 20 kick returns for 493 yards. 24 punt returns for 172 yards.
1992: 49 catches for 764 yards and 5 TD. 6 carries for 37 yards and one touchdown. 27 kick returns for 675 yards and one touchdown. 31 punt returns for 346 yards and one touchdown.

Professional career
He had over 1,000 yards three times in his twelve-year NFL career, in which he played for the Chicago Bears, the San Diego Chargers, the New York Jets and the San Francisco 49ers.

During his twelve years in the NFL, Conway threw for two touchdown passes, a rarity for the wide receiver position. The most notable of the two came during a game against the Miami Dolphins on November 13, 1994. Conway lined up split off of and parallel to the holder, on a bizarre field goal formation. Rather than the snap being taken by Erik Kramer, Conway received it, and threw a pass which was tipped up into the air by a Dolphins' defender and caught by fellow Bears' teammate and tight end, Keith Jennings and run into the endzone for a touchdown. His 329 catches during his tenure with the Bears (1993-1999) place him 4th in franchise history on their all-time receptions list, and his 4,498 receiving yards rank him 6th on the Bears’ all-time yardage list. He also was the 1st Chicago Bears receiver to record back to back 1000 yard seasons.

NFL career statistics

Broadcasting
Beginning in 2009, Conway began working as a color analyst on national NFL radio broadcasts by Compass Media Networks. He teamed with Lee "Hacksaw" Hamilton and
Gregg "Free Beer" Daniels on play-by-play. He is currently a studio analyst for the Pac-12 Network and a cohost of Total Access on the NFL Network. He joined the San Diego Chargers network for the 2015 season as a studio analyst.

Personal life
On July 23, 2007, Conway married female boxing champ Laila Ali, the daughter of Muhammad Ali. He has three children from a previous marriage:  twins Cameron and Kelton Conway (b. 1995), and Leilani Conway (b. 1999). Conway and Ali welcomed their first child, Curtis Muhammad Conway, Jr. on August 26, 2008. On April 4, 2011, they welcomed their second child, a daughter, Sydney Jurldine Conway.

References

http://articles.latimes.com/keyword/hawthorne-coach-kye-courtney

1971 births
Living people
American football wide receivers
Chicago Bears players
National Football League announcers
New York Jets players
Players of American football from Los Angeles
San Diego Chargers players
San Francisco 49ers players
USC Trojans football players
Sportspeople from Hawthorne, California
Track and field athletes from California
Sportspeople from Los Angeles